Ramblin' is an album led by jazz pianist Paul Bley recorded in Italy in 1966 and released on the French BYG Actuel label.

Reception 

Allmusic awarded the album 4 stars stating "Ramblin' comes from an adventurous period in Paul Bley's career, at a time when he was associated with some of the more avant-garde elements. His playing often takes an attractively aggressive approach, which he tempered in later years".

Track listing 
 "Both" (Annette Peacock) – 9:30
 "Albert's Love Theme" (Peacock) – 9:23
 "Ida Lupino" (Carla Bley) – 3:30
 "Ramblin'" (Ornette Coleman) – 5:50
 "Touching" (Peacock) – 7:30
 "Mazatalon" (Paul Bley) – 7:32

Personnel 
 Paul Bley – piano
 Mark Levinson – bass
 Barry Altschul – drums

References 

1967 albums
Paul Bley albums
BYG Actuel albums